Perivaldo Lúcio Dantas (12 July 1953 – 27 July 2017), known simply as Perivaldo, was a Brazilian footballer who played as a right back.

Football career
Born in Itabuna, Bahia, Perivaldo started his career with local amateurs Itabuna Esporte Clube. In 1975 he moved straight to the Série A where he would remain until his retirement, starting with Esporte Clube Bahia.

In his country's top flight Perivaldo also represented Botafogo de Futebol e Regatas, São Paulo FC, Sociedade Esportiva Palmeiras and Bangu Atlético Clube. He scored seven goals for the first in only 13 appearances in the 1982 season, helping it finish in 18th position amongst 44 teams.

Perivaldo earned two caps for Brazil. In the late 80s, after living three years in South Korea, he relocated to Portugal in hopes of finding a new club, but eventual poor choices and several misfortunes ended up with him as a homeless person having to resort to street vending in Lisbon.

Perivaldo returned to his homeland on 11 December 2013 at the age of 60, with the help of the Portuguese Professional Footballers Union. He had been subjected to a three-week follow-up by Portuguese TV channel SIC, and that and posterior footage resulted in the making of a documentary.

Death
Perivaldo died on 27 July 2017 at the age of 64 in Rio de Janeiro, victim of pneumonia.

See also
Bola de Ouro
1984 President's Cup Football Tournament
List of foreign K League Classic players

References

External links

1953 births
2017 deaths
Brazilian footballers
Association football defenders
Campeonato Brasileiro Série A players
Esporte Clube Bahia players
Botafogo de Futebol e Regatas players
São Paulo FC players
Sociedade Esportiva Palmeiras players
Bangu Atlético Clube players
K League 1 players
Jeju United FC players
Brazil international footballers
Brazilian expatriate footballers
Expatriate footballers in South Korea
Brazilian expatriate sportspeople in South Korea
Brazilian expatriate sportspeople in Portugal
Homeless people
Deaths from pneumonia in Rio de Janeiro (state)
Sportspeople from Bahia